Aleksandar Atanasijević (born 4 September 1991) is a Serbian professional volleyball player. He is a member of the Serbia national team, a participant in the Olympic Games London 2012, and a two–time European Champion (2011, 2019). At the professional club level, he plays for PGE Skra Bełchatów.

Career

Clubs

His first professional club was Serbian OK Partizan. His trainer was Slavko Balandžić. In 2011, he moved to Polish Champion, one of the most successful Polish teams of PlusLiga – PGE Skra Bełchatów. In his first season in Poland, he was mainly a substitute player for Mariusz Wlazły. In the second season, he has become a major player on his position repeatedly winning the statuette for best player of the match. With PGE Skra Belchatów, he won a silver medal of the Polish Championship, Polish Cup, and a silver medal of the Club World Championship. In 2012, Atanasijević won a silver medal of the CEV Champions League after the match against Zenit Kazan during the Final Four held in Łódź, Poland. In 2013, he moved to Italian club – Sir Safety Perugia. In 2014, he won a silver medal of the Italian Championship after losing matches against Lube. In May 2014, he signed a new three–year contract with Sir Safety Perugia.

National team
He is a gold medalist of 2011 European Championship, and bronze medalist of the 2013 European Championship. He was a member of the national team at the Olympic Games London 2012. On 19 July 2015, the Serbian national team with him in squad reached the final of the 2015 World League, but lost to France (0–3), and eventually achieved a silver medal. Atanasijević received an individual award for the Best Opposite Spiker of the tournament.

Honours

Clubs
 CEV Champions League
  2011/2012 – with PGE Skra Bełchatów
  2016/2017 – with Sir Safety Conad Perugia
 National championships
 2010/2011  Serbian Championship, with OK Partizan
 2011/2012  Polish Cup, with PGE Skra Bełchatów
 2012/2013  Polish SuperCup, with PGE Skra Bełchatów
 2017/2018  Italian SuperCup, with Sir Safety Conad Perugia
 2017/2018  Italian Cup, with Sir Safety Conad Perugia
 2017/2018  Italian Championship, with Sir Safety Conad Perugia
 2018/2019  Italian Cup, with Sir Safety Conad Perugia
 2019/2020  Italian SuperCup, with Sir Safety Conad Perugia

Youth national team
 2009  CEV U19 European Championship
 2009  FIVB U19 World Championship
 2013  FIVB U23 World Championship

Individual awards
 2009: CEV U19 European Championship – Best Opposite Spiker
 2009: FIVB U19 World Championship – Most Valuable Player
 2010: CEV U20 European Championship – Best Spiker
 2011: FIVB U21 World Championship – Best Scorer
 2012: FIVB Club World Championship – Best Scorer
 2013: CEV European Championship – Best Scorer
 2013: FIVB U23 World Championship – Best Opposite Spiker
 2014: Italian Championship – Best Scorer
 2014: Italian Championship – Best Spiker
 2015: Italian Championship – Best Scorer
 2015: Italian Championship – Best Spiker
 2015: FIVB World League – Best Opposite Spiker
 2016: Italian Championship – Best Scorer
 2016: Italian Championship – Best Spiker
 2017: CEV Champions League – Best Opposite Spiker
 2018: Italian Cup – Most Valuable Player
 2018: Italian Championship – Most Valuable Player
 2019: CEV European Championship – Best Opposite Spiker

References

External links

 
 Player profile at LegaVolley.it  
 Player profile at PlusLiga.pl 
 Player profile at Volleybox.net
 
 
 

1991 births
Living people
Sportspeople from Belgrade
Serbian men's volleyball players
European champions for Serbia
Serbian Champions of men's volleyball
Olympic volleyball players of Serbia
Volleyball players at the 2012 Summer Olympics
Serbian expatriate sportspeople in Poland
Expatriate volleyball players in Poland
Serbian expatriate sportspeople in Italy
Expatriate volleyball players in Italy
Skra Bełchatów players
Opposite hitters